The International Civil Service Commission (ICSC) is a subsidiary body of the United Nations General Assembly, established pursuant to General Assembly Resolution 3357 (XXIX) of 18 December 1974. According to its statute, the ICSC is charged with the regulation and coordination of the conditions of service for the United Nations common system staff.

The ICSC, which has its headquarters in New York City, is composed of fifteen members, appointed by the General Assembly for four-year terms. The fifteen members include the chairman and the vice-chairman as full-time members.

See also 
 Standards of Conduct for the International Civil Service

References

External links 
 ICSC Home page
 UN System: International Civil Service Commission (United Nations System, Chief Executives Board for Coordination)
 Actions: International Civil Service Commission (United Nations System, Chief Executives Board for Coordination)

United Nations General Assembly subsidiary organs